Poplar Ridge was a community in Madison County, Alabama, near Huntsville. It was home to Poplar Ridge School. The school is commemorated with a historical marker. Poplar Ridge was home to Canada Butler who served in the Alabama House of Representatives in 1862. He died while in Montgomery and is buried in Montgomery, Alabama. His son James Edward Butler also served in the state legislature. Another son, Samuel Riley Butler was a school principal, served as superintendent of Madison County, Alabama schools, and led his own school in Huntsville. S. R. Butler High School was named for him. There is a Poplar Ridge Road in the area. The community had a post office. In 1874, it was documented as a township in Madison County, Alabama with a population of 611.

Members of the Maples family also lived in Poplar Ridge.

Poplar Ridge School opened in 1858. A neo-classical building was constructed for to in 1875. It had as many as 100 students. It was consolidated with New Hope High School in 1941.

Poplar Ridge was an election precinct and in 1880 testimony was given about election activities there in an inspection of election practices at the precinct during the investigation of a contested election. In the early 20th century the precinct had a little more than 1,000 residents.

Notable residents
Canada Butler, state legislator in 1862
James Edward Butler, born in Poplar Ridge May 20, 1843, became a state legislator.

References

Populated places in Alabama